"Sleepwalking" is a song by American electronic rock group The Chain Gang of 1974. It was written by the group's frontman Kamtin Mohager along with James Bailey, Rami Jrade and Ryan Ogren. The song was originally recorded by Mohager for his third studio album, Daydream Forever, where it appears as the third track. "Sleepwalking" was first released as a remixed version of the Daydream Forever track, included on the 2013 soundtrack-compilation album The Music of Grand Theft Auto V, where it appeared as the closing track on the first "volume" of the album.

A "Sleepwalking" promotional single, featuring the Daydream Forever track of the same name, was released by Warner Bros. Records to US Modern rock radio on February 4, 2014, serving as the second release by Mohager in promotion of Daydream Forever, following the 2013 single, "Miko". A later "Sleepwalking" single was released in the United States by Warner Bros. on March 18, 2014. The three-track single features "Sleepwalking" and acoustic "Daydreamer" versions of Daydream Forever tracks "You" and "Sleepwalking".

Usage in media
In addition to featuring on The Music of Grand Theft Auto V, the track was heavily used in-game and in promotional media for the 2013 Rockstar North open world action-adventure video game Grand Theft Auto V. The track was used in the official trailer for the game, and in various television commercials and spots promoting the game.

Music video
A music video for the song was released on the bands' official YouTube channel on April 16, 2014.

Track listing

Personnel
Adapted from Daydream Forever liner notes.

The Chain Gang of 1974
 Kamtin Mohager – vocals, music, production

Charts and accolades

Weekly charts

Accolades

Release history

Commercial

Promotional

References

2014 singles
Warner Records singles
2013 songs
Songs written by Ryan Ogren
The Chain Gang of 1974 songs
Songs written by Nick Bailey
Grand Theft Auto V
Grand Theft Auto music